The ISPS Handa Singapore Classic was a golf tournament on the Asian Tour from 2010 to 2012 at the Orchid Country Club in Singapore. It was played for the first time in September 2010. The purse was US$400,000 in 2010 and 2012 and US$300,000 in 2011.

Winners

Notes

External links
Coverage on the Asian Tour's official site

Former Asian Tour events
Golf tournaments in Singapore
Recurring sporting events established in 2010
Recurring sporting events disestablished in 2012
International Sports Promotion Society